Theologie und Glaube is a German academic journal, published since 1909 by the Faculty of Theology Paderborn. , the journal's editors are Bernd Irlenborn, Christoph Jacobs and Michael Konkel.

External links

Academic journals published in Germany
Publications established in 1909
Religious studies journals